Be My Dream Family is a South Korean television series starring Choi Jung-woo, Park Joon-geum, Wang Ji-hye, Ham Eun-jung, and Joo Ah-reum. The series, directed by Kim Jeong-gyoo and written by Yeo Myung-jae, revolves around two culturally different families becoming one when their parents remarry. The daily drama was premiered on KBS1 on March 29, 2021 and aired on every weekday at 20:30 (KST) till October 1.

Although Be My Dream Family was consistently among the three most-watched television programs in South Korea everyday, it drew the lowest viewership for KBS1's traditional 20:30 (KST) family drama time slot. Its ratings never increased from its pilot-episode figure of 18.4%, and it was the first in that time slot to never break the 20% mark. During the Chuseok holidays, the 111th and 112th episodes of Be My Dream Family drew nationwide ratings of 9.7% and 9.3%—the first time in 11 years that a KBS1 daily drama got single-digit ratings since Happiness in the Wind was defeated by a World Cup game. Lead actor Ryu Jin admitted that Be My Dream Family made a "new attempt" on the format and that it was "not the existing daily drama style," but thought there should still be "a drama that touches the heart."

Synopsis
The story of the series revolves around two families Geum family and Han family with different views on familial duties. They meet when their parents remarry in the twilight of life, and they become one family. The series follows the conflict, understanding and harmony of the extended family, showing meaning of a true family.

Cast

Main
 Choi Jung-woo as Geum Jong-hwa
71 years old, father of Geum Sang-baek, Geum Sang-goo and Geum Sang-min; declares remarriage, operates an interior shop
 Park Joon-geum as Kang Mo-ran
65 years old, operates Moran Hair 
 Wang Ji-hye as Han Geu-roo
36 years old, the eldest daughter of Mo-ran, the editor-in-chief of a children's publishing house, Da-bal's sister
 Hahm Eun-jung as Han Da-bal
34 years old, Mo-ran's second daughter, Master Judo-Kwan, judo instructor, Geu-roo's sister
 Joo Da-young as Min Ga-eun 
26 year old, member of the design team of Arang Publishing House, Han Da-bal's sister-in-law

Supporting
 Ryu Jin as Geum Sang-baek 
47 years old, housewife, In Young-hye's husband, the Geum family's first son
 Park Tam-hee as In Young-hye
 Han Sung-yun as young In Young-hye (ep.7)
45 years old, physical therapist, Geum Sang-baek's wife, the Geum family's first daughter-in-law

 Im Hyung-joon as Geum Sang-goo
45 years old, broadcaster PD, Oh Min-hee's husband, Sang-baek's younger brother, the Geum family's second son
 Yoon Hae-young as Oh Min-hee 
48 years old, actor, Geum Sang-goo's wife, the Geum family's second daughter-in-law
 Lee Tae-gu as Geum Sang-min
33 years old, aspiring artist, the third son of Geum Jong-hwa, obsessed with painting
 Kim In-yi as Geum Min-ah
20 years old, the eldest of the fraternal twins of Geum Sang-baek and In Young-hye
 Ok Jin-wook as Geum In-seo
20 years old, re-student, Geum Sang-baek and In Young-hye's son, Geum Min-ah's fraternal twin brother
 Lee Go-eun as Min Sol 
8 years old, daughter of Han Da-bal
Neighbors
 Park Jae-jung as Choi Ji-wan 
41 years old, representative of a children's publishing company, where Han Geu-roo is editor-in-chief
 Seo Woo-seung as Choi Yi-jae
8 years old, Choi Ji-wan's son
 Joo Jong-hyuk as Hyun Si-woon
36 years old, a book marketer
 Yang So-min as Ki Yoo-young
 Kim Ye-byeol as young Ki Yoo-young
45 years old, a doctor in the department of rehabilitation medicine
 Cho Han-gyeol as Im Heon 
20 years old, spoiled son of Ki Yoo-young
 Yoo Jang-young as Lee Je-moon
Design team leader of the Arang Publishing Company, where Han Geu-roo is editor-in-chief

Production

Casting
Ham Eun-jung is appearing in TV series after three years. She last appeared in 2018 TV series Lovely Horribly. Park Tam-hee is returning to daily drama after 2015 drama Enchanting Neighbor. Choi Jung-woo and Park Joon-geum are appearing as twilight couple after three years, they appeared in 2018 drama Marry Me Now. On February 25, Yang So-min was confirmed to play Yoo-Young Ki, a doctor in the department of rehabilitation medicine. Wang Ji-hye, Ham Eun-jung and Joo Ah-reum were confirmed to play the three leading characters of sisters in an extended family.

Release
On 15 March, KBS World released a teaser and changed the title for international audience to: Be My Dream Family.

Original soundtrack

Part 1

Part 2

Part 3

Part 4

Part 5

Viewership

Awards and nominations

International broadcast

Notes

References

External links
  
 
 
 Be My Dream Family at Daum 
 Be My Dream Family at Naver 

Korean Broadcasting System television dramas
2021 South Korean television series debuts
2021 South Korean television series endings
Korean-language television shows
South Korean romance television series